The Palazzo Venturini is a palace located on Strada Farini #15 in central Parma, region of Emilia-Romagna, Italy.

History
Adjacent to the church of San Ambrogio, this palace once housed the Collegiata di San Girolamo. By the early 16th century, it was acquired by the Count  Bajardi, when in 1519 the seminary moved to the church of San Pietro. The interiors have a frescoed room with putti and garlands, attributed to Mercurio Bajardi. It is presently a private residence.

References

Venturini
Renaissance architecture in Parma